Here with Me may refer to:

 Here with Me (album), a 2009 album by Holly Williams
 "Here with Me" (Philip Bailey song), 1994
 "Here with Me" (Dido song), 1999
 "Here with Me" (MercyMe song), 2004
 "Here with Me" (Arika Kane song), 2010
 "Here with Me" (The Killers song), 2012
 "Here with Me" (Marshmello song), 2019
 "Here with Me", a song by REO Speedwagon from the album The Hits, 1988
 "Here with Me", a song by Plumb from the album candycoatedwaterdrops, 1999
 "Here with Me", a song by Michelle Branch from the album The Spirit Room, 2001